Michael Anthony Moxon (23 January 194228 July 2019) was Dean of Truro from 1998 until his resignation in 2004.

He was educated at Merchant Taylors, Durham University and   Heythrop College, London. Ordained in 1971 he was a curate at Lowestoft then Sacrist of St Paul's Cathedral, Vicar of Tewkesbury and Canon of Windsor 1996 - 1998 before his move to Truro.

Notes

1942 births
People educated at Merchant Taylors' School, Northwood
Alumni of Durham University
Alumni of Heythrop College
Honorary Chaplains to the Queen
Deans of Truro
2019 deaths
Canons of Windsor